Metropolitan Brewing is a brewery located in Chicago, Illinois that was founded in 2008 by (former) husband and wife team Doug Hurst and Tracy Hurst. The brewery was originally located in a converted warehouse in a historically industrial area of the Ravenswood neighborhood in Chicago. In 2017, they moved to a larger facility with a taproom at 3057 N Rockwell Street in Chicago.  Metropolitan focuses on brewing lagers in the traditional German style. They are the sole craft brewery in Chicago that produces only lagers. Mr. Hurst has earned a brewing diploma at the Siebel Institute of Technology & World Brewing Academy.

Beers 

The names of Metropolitan Brewing's beers reflect the industrial history of Chicago.

Metropolitan's beers are distributed by Windy City Distribution, Wolf Distribution, and Breakthrough Beverage.

References

External links 
 Metropolitan Brewing Official Site

Beer brewing companies based in Chicago
Manufacturing companies based in Chicago
American beer brands